The Elizabeth Arden Building is an historic building, located at 1147 Connecticut Avenue, Northwest, Washington, D.C., in downtown Washington, D.C.

History
Built in 1929, the former Elizabeth Arden beauty salon is an example of Georgian Revival architecture, and the city's only known design of architect Mott B. Schmidt. The Elizabeth Arden Building was listed on the National Register of Historic Places in 2003.
It was renovated for the Tiny Jewel Box store, in 1996.

See also
 Demonet Building
 National Register of Historic Places listings in Washington, D.C.
 Waggaman-Ray Commercial Row

References

External links

 
 

Commercial buildings completed in 1929
Retail buildings in Washington, D.C.
Commercial buildings on the National Register of Historic Places in Washington, D.C.
Georgian Revival architecture in Washington, D.C.